Apollonia is an unincorporated community located in the town of Stubbs, Rusk County, Wisconsin, United States.

References

Unincorporated communities in Rusk County, Wisconsin
Unincorporated communities in Wisconsin